Adabas D is a relational database management system owned by Software AG since 1994, when Software AG acquired SQL-Datenbanksysteme GmbH from Siemens Nixdorf AG.

SAP AG's MaxDB is based on ADABAS D version 6.1.15.57, licensed from Software AG in 1997, and originally sold as SAP DB. MaxDB is provided for use with SAP, as an alternative to other more costly RDBMS systems.

Star Division (and later Sun Microsystems) used Adabas D for its product StarOffice, and the personal edition of Adabas D was included in SuSE Linux. An Adabas D adapter was provided in OpenOffice.org.

See also 

 ADABAS
 MaxDB

References

External links 

 
 ADABAS D Community Discussion Forum

Proprietary database management systems